Star force may refer to:
 Star Force, a 1984 video game by Tecmo
 Mega Man Star Force, a video game in the Mega Man franchise
 The South Australian STAR Force, a police tactical group similar to SWAT in the United States
 Starforce (comics), a Marvel Comics team formed of super-powered Kree
 Starforce: Alpha Centauri, a science fiction board game copyright 1974 by Simulations Publications, Inc.
 Star Force, a military like team that served aboard the Argo in the animation series Star Blazers.
 StarForce Technologies is a Russian software developer with headquarters in Moscow.